The 1978 New Hampshire Wildcats football team was an American football team that represented the University of New Hampshire as a member of the Yankee Conference during the 1978 NCAA Division I-AA football season. In its seventh year under head coach Bill Bowes, the team compiled a 6–4–1 record (1–3–1 against conference opponents) and finished fifth out of six teams in the Yankee Conference.

Schedule

References

New Hampshire
New Hampshire Wildcats football seasons
New Hampshire Wildcats football